FC Sudnostroitel Sevastopol was a Soviet club from Crimea, Russian SFSR that was founded in 1923 as Yuzhny Metallist (Sevastopol). Sometime prior to 1936 it carried name of the Ordzhonikidze Marine Factory (Sevastopol).

History
Previous names:
 1923–????: Yuzhnyi Metallist Sevastopol
 ????–1936: Morskoi Zavod im. S. Ordzhonikidze Sevastopol
 1937–????: Sudnostroitel Sevastopol

The football team Yuzhnyi Metallist Sevastopol was founded in Sevastopol in 1923 and represented the Sevastopol Shipyard (Morskoi Zavod im. S. Ordzhonikidze Sevastopol).

In the years 1936–1938 the team competed in the Soviet Cup. In 1937 the club adopted the name Sudnostroitel Sevastopol. He appeared in the Championship of Russian FSSR and the Cup of Russian FSSR and local tournaments. In 1947 he won the championship of the Crimea.

In 1949, the club debuted in the Soviet First League, but then played in local competitions.

League and cup history (Soviet Union)
Sources: 
{|class="wikitable"
|-bgcolor="#efefef"
! Season
! Div.
! Pos.
! Pl.
! W
! D
! L
! GS
! GA
! P
!Domestic Cup
!colspan=2|Europe
!Notes
|- bgcolor=SteelBlue
|align=center|1937
|align=center colspan=9|...
|align=center| finals
|align=center|
|align=center|
|align=center|
|- bgcolor=SteelBlue
|align=center|1938
|align=center colspan=9|...
|align=center|Zone 19, final
|align=center|
|align=center|
|align=center|
|- 
|align=center colspan=14|...
|- bgcolor=LightCyan
|align=center|1949
|align=center|2nd First League, Russian SSR Gr. 1
|align=center|10/11
|align=center|20
|align=center|6
|align=center|1
|align=center|13
|align=center|30
|align=center|49
|align=center|13
|align=center|Zone 1 Russian SSR,  finals
|align=center|
|align=center|
|align=center bgcolor=pink|Relegated
|}

References

External links
 PFC Sevastopol. Zorya Luhansk website. 3 November 2010

Defunct football clubs in Sevastopol
Defunct football clubs in the Soviet Union
Crimea Oblast
Association football clubs established in 1923
Association football clubs disestablished in the 1950s
1923 establishments in the Soviet Union
1950s disestablishments in the Soviet Union